Telegony is a pseudoscientific theory of heredity holding that offspring can inherit the characteristics of a previous mate of the female parent; thus the child of a woman might partake of traits of a previous sexual partner.  Experiments in the late 19th century on several species failed to provide evidence that offspring would inherit any character from their mother's previous mates.  It was superseded by the rediscovery of Mendelian inheritance and the Boveri–Sutton chromosome theory. 

No evidence exists of any true telegenetic mechanism of inheritance.

Etymology and description 

Telegony is that idea that the a female will be permanently affected the time she is first impregnated, since the fetus will pass back characteristics to her that will affect all future offspring, no matter their progeny.

The term was coined by August Weismann from the Greek words τῆλε (tèle) meaning 'far' and γονος (gonos) meaning 'offspring'.

Early perceptions 

The idea of telegony goes back to Aristotle. It states that individuals can inherit traits not only from their fathers, but also from other males previously known to their mothers. In other words, it was thought that paternity could be shared.

The theory, expounded as part of Aristotle's biology, was accepted throughout Antiquity. The concept of telegonic impregnation was expressed in Greek mythology in the origins of their heroes. Such double fatherhood, one immortal, one mortal, was a familiar feature of heroes such as Theseus, who was doubly conceived in the same night. By the understanding of sex in Antiquity, the mix of semen gave Theseus a combination of divine as well as mortal characteristics. Of a supposed Parnassos, founder of Delphi, Pausanias observes, "Like the other heroes, as they are called, he had two fathers; one they say was the god Poseidon, the human father being Cleopompus." Sometimes the result could be twins such as Castor and Pollux, one born divine and one mortal.

The more general doctrine of "maternal impressions" was also known in Ancient Israel. The book of Genesis describes Jacob inducing goats and sheep in Laban's herds to bear striped and spotted young by placing dark wooden rods with white stripes in their watering troughs. Telegony influenced early Christianity as well. The Gnostic followers of Valentinius (circa 100–160 CE) characteristically took the concept from the physiological world into the realm of psychology and spirituality by extending the supposed influence even to the thoughts of the woman. In the Gospel of Philip, a text among those found at Nag Hammadi:

Whomever the woman loves, to him those who are born are like; if her husband, they are like her husband; if an adulterer, they are like the adulterer. Often when a woman sleeps with her husband, but while her heart is with the adulterer with whom she is accustomed to unite, she bears the one whom she bears so that he is like the adulterer. 

The concept of telegony was revived with the rediscovery of Aristotle in the Middle Ages. This was part of the resistance to the marriage in 1361 of Edward, the Black Prince, heir to the throne of Edward III of England, with Joan, the Fair Maid of Kent, who had been previously married: their progeny, it was thought, might not be completely of his Plantagenet blood.

Understandings in the 19th century and the collapse of the theory in the 20th 
In the 19th century, the most widely credited example was that of Lord Morton's mare, reported by the distinguished surgeon Sir Everard Home, and cited by Charles Darwin. Lord Morton bred a white mare with a wild quagga stallion, and when he later bred the same mare with a white stallion, the offspring strangely had stripes in the legs, like the quagga.

The Surgeon-General of New York, the physiologist Austin Flint, in his Text-Book of Human Physiology (fourth edition, 1888) described the phenomenon as follows:

Both Schopenhauer and Herbert Spencer found telegony to be a credible theory; August Weismann, on the other hand, had expressed doubts about the theory earlier and it fell out of scientific favor in the 1890s. A series of experiments by James Cossar Ewart in Scotland and other researchers in Germany and Brazil failed to find any evidence of the phenomenon. Also, the statistician Karl Pearson tried to find an evidence for telegony in humans using family measurement data and the statistical methods he invented, but failed to conclude that the steady telegonic influence really exists.

Biologists now explain the phenomenon of Lord Morton's mare with reference to the dominant and recessive variants of a gene: both the mare and the stallion had a recessive gene; the foal inherited these alleles and thus displayed the characteristic invisible in its parents.

In mammals, each sperm has the haploid set of chromosomes and each egg has another haploid set. During the process of fertilization a zygote with the diploid set is produced. This set will be inherited by every somatic cell of a mammal, with exactly half the genetic material coming from the producer of the sperm (the father) and another half from the producer of the egg (the mother). Thus, the myth of telegony is fundamentally incompatible with our knowledge of genetics and the reproductive process. Encyclopædia Britannica stated "All these beliefs, from inheritance of acquired traits to telegony, must now be classed as superstitions."

Influence in culture 

Telegony influenced late 19th-century racialist beliefs. A woman who had a child with a non-Aryan man, it was argued, could never have a "pure" Aryan child at a later point in time. This idea was adopted by the German Nazi Party.

Telegony re-emerged within post-Soviet Russian Orthodoxy. Virginity and Telegony: The Orthodox church and modern science of genetic inversions was published in 2004. Pravda.ru gave an overview of the concept and a brief review of the book, saying that the authors invented "scary and incredible stories" to "make women be very careful about their sexual contacts" and that the idea was being used by the Church to scare the faithful. Anna Kuznetsova, who was appointed Children's Rights Commissioner for the Russian Federation in 2016, had said several years earlier that she believes in the concept, amongst other fringe views. The founding editor of the business newspaper Vedomosti, Leonoid Bershidsky, interpreted the appointment of someone with such views as a sign that Russian President Vladimir Putin was becoming more ideological.

The religious practice known as P'ikareum is an unusual variant in that it holds that one can purify one’s own bloodline from sin by having sex with a holy person, such as the founder of one of the religious sects that engages in this practice.

See also
 Epigenetics
 Transgenerational epigenetic inheritance
 Maternal effect
 Microchimerism
 Racial hygiene

Notes

References

Book/journal 

 
 
 
 

Obsolete biology theories
Pseudoscience